Neochevalierodendron is a genus of flowering plants in the family Fabaceae. It belongs to the subfamily Detarioideae. It contains a single species, Neochevalierodendron stephanii.

References

Detarioideae
Monotypic Fabaceae genera
Taxa named by Auguste Chevalier